The Southern New Hampshire League was a Class D level Minor League Baseball league which operated in four New Hampshire cities in .

Teams
Epping (Epping, New Hampshire)
Fremont (Fremont, New Hampshire
Kingston (Kingston, New Hampshire)
Newton (Newton, New Hampshire)

References

External links
Baseball-Reference (Minors)

Defunct minor baseball leagues in the United States
Baseball leagues in New Hampshire
Defunct baseball teams in New Hampshire